Krieghoff is a surname. Notable people with the surname include:

Cornelius Krieghoff (1815–1872), Dutch-Canadian painter 
Elise Krieghoff (born 1993), American soccer player

See also
Krieghoff, a manufacturer of high-end hunting and sport firearms